Dave Mirra Freestyle BMX 2 is a sports video game developed by Z-Axis and Full Fat and published by Acclaim Entertainment under their Acclaim Max Sports label. It was released for the PlayStation 2 in August 2001, and in the following months it was ported to the GameCube, Game Boy Advance, and Xbox video game systems. Both the GameCube and Xbox ports featured two extra levels that were not present in the PS2 version.

In the game, players can take on the role of one of 13 top BMX riders, or a number of other characters. Along with the pro riders, there are 3 hidden characters. One of which was teenager Mike Dias, who won the grand prize in the Slim Jim Sweepstakes, getting his likeness put into the game, the Slim Jim man from commercials, and Amish Boy, who rode with a corn cob pipe on a wooden bike.

Gameplay
The game has several different modes of play.

Proquest
The first, and main mode is Proquest, a story mode (single player). The player selects a character to portray, and then has several 3 minute runs to complete set goals (ranking from Beginner to Insane), such as grinding 50 meters down a grind bar or scoring 50,000 points in a single run. By completing these quests, the player earns respect points. After collecting enough respect points, they then unlock new areas and bikes. In each new area the set of goals is different. After earning enough points, the player will be invited to a competition, where they have to show their skills at biking by not only scoring high, but also by performing a variety of tricks, modifiers, spins, and grinds. Players can also earn 1000 respect points by finding all the gaps in a particular park. Gaps, as the name implies, are gaps between two items, such as between two jumps, or from one side of a river to another. There are 10 parks total; Woodward camp (9 gaps), Trainyards (23 gaps), Swamp trails (17 gaps), Commercial district (16 gaps), Greenville NC (10 gaps), Galloon water park (13 gaps), HWY 47 Cloverleaf (8 gaps), Devil's peak (18 gaps), Airport garage (11 gaps), Venice Italy (18 gaps).

Session
In Session mode, players take part in 3 minute runs just as with Proquest mode, but without set goals. Players can simply try to score high, or explore different areas of the park, break records, and discover gaps.

Freeride
In Freeride, players take part in runs without any time limits. This mode is useful if one is just trying to explore all the nooks and crannies of the park or attempting to discover secrets. The player cannot break records or discover gaps, since there is no time limit, and it is technically considered cheating. Therefore, any score gained is disregarded.

Park Editor
The Park Editor is a fairly powerful feature of the game that allows the user to create their own Bikepark to ride in the Session, Multiplayer and Freeride game modes. The park is created by placing premade objects on a blank area of a themed map. Gaps between objects can also be added. The player can then save the park and ride it. Players cannot, however, create goals like the ones featured in Proquest.

Multiplayer
Two people can play different game types in this mode, on any level unlocked or created. Being one of the major areas where the game could have used improvement, Dave Mirra Freestyle BMX 2 supports only two players at one time, and they must alternate instead of playing simultaneously (as in many other extreme sports titles). One of the multiplayer games was similar to the basketball game "HORSE", with the exception that players can name the game whatever they chose. The object of the game was to perform a trick, and then the next player would have to perform the same trick, otherwise end up with a letter. Once the word was complete, the game was over. Another one was called Wipeout. The two players took turns crashing the hardest to get points. Who ever had the most points in a single hit wins.

Riders
 Dave Mirra
 Ryan Nyquist
 Mike Laird
 Tim Mirra
 Zach Shaw
 Joey Garcia
 Troy McMurray
 Leigh Ramsdell

Reception

Dave Mirra Freestyle BMX 2 received "generally favorable reviews" on all platforms according to video game review aggregator Metacritic. Jim Preston of NextGens December 2001 issue said that the PlayStation 2 version has "tons o' tricks; gigantic, engaging levels; a park editor; and excellent challenges. What more do you need?" The magazine later said of the Xbox version in its final issue: "We wish the graphics were a little more polished, but if you're looking for fun (with brutal-looking injuries when you crash), then this is the game to get."

References

External links

2001 video games
BMX mass media
Cycling video games 
Mirra, Dave Freestyle BMX 2
Full Fat games
Game Boy Advance games
GameCube games
PlayStation 2 games
Multiplayer and single-player video games
Video games developed in the United Kingdom
Video games developed in the United States
Xbox games

pt:Dave Mirra Freestyle BMX